The enzyme phosphatidylinositol-3,4,5-trisphosphate 3-phosphatase (EC 3.1.3.67) catalyzes the chemical reaction

1-phosphatidyl-1D-myo-inositol 3,4,5-trisphosphate + H2O = 1-phosphatidyl-1D-myoinositol 4,5-bisphosphate + phosphate

This enzyme class belongs to the family of hydrolases, specifically those acting on phosphoric monoester bonds.  The systematic name is 1-phosphatidyl-D-myoinositol-3,4,5-trisphosphate 3-phosphohydrolase. Other names in common use include PTEN, MMAC1, and phosphatidylinositol-3,4,5-trisphosphate 3-phosphohydrolase. PTEN also refers to a member of the class, phosphatase and tensin homolog. This enzyme participates in 10 metabolic pathways: inositol phosphate metabolism, phosphatidylinositol signaling system, p53 signaling pathway, focal adhesion, tight junction, endometrial cancer, glioma, prostate cancer, melanoma, and small cell lung cancer.  It employs one cofactor, magnesium.

References

 
 

EC 3.1.3
Magnesium enzymes
Enzymes of unknown structure